This is a timeline documenting the events of heavy metal in the year 2013.

Bands disbanded
 Ava Inferi
 Cataract
 Kiuas
 The Chariot
 Forbidden
 Gaza
 God Forbid
 Inhale Exhale
 Nachtmystium
 Power Quest
 Static-X
 Vomitory
 Weapon

Bands reformed
 Dark Angel
 Falconer
 Gardenian
 Luna Mortis
 Minsk
 Mutiny Within
 Sonic Syndicate
 SugarComa (one-off reunion)
 Toxik

Events
 Paul Di'Anno (ex-Iron Maiden) retired after his 2012 tour.
 HammerFall went on hiatus this year and did not release their next album until 2014.
 Lars Ulrich confirmed that Metallica's Orion Music + More festival will be held again this year.
 Ceremonial Oath, who split up in 1995, and Gardenian, who split up in 2004 and had not played a show in 12 years, both reunited for this year's edition of The Gothenburg Sound festival, which took place from January 4–5 at Trädgår'n in Gothenburg, Sweden.
 Metal Church, who split up twice (in 1994 and 2009), reunited for a second time at this year's 70000 Tons of Metal in January.
 Lamb of God singer Randy Blythe stood trial on February 4 on charges of manslaughter in the death of a fan at a concert in Prague, Czech Republic in 2010. He was acquitted on 5 March 2013 of all charges against him.  Drummer Chris Adler said in an interview "Not only were we not able to generate any income, but we ended up having to pay more than half a million dollars in legal fees," the drummer said. "It bankrupted the entire band, no money left for any kind of payroll or anything."
 Rush was inducted into the Rock and Roll Hall of Fame, at the Nokia Theater in Los Angeles, California on April 18.
 Liege Lord, who split up in 1989,  reunited at the Keep It True XVI festival, which took place from April 19–20 at Tauberfrankenhalle in Lauda-Königshofen, Germany. They were the headliner of the festival.
 Cannibal Corpse celebrated the 25th anniversary of their formation.
 Anthrax announced the departure of guitarist Rob Caggiano.
 Volbeat announced that "former Anthrax and The Damned Things guitarist Rob Caggiano has officially joined Volbeat." Caggiano served as producer on "Outlaw Gentlemen & Shady Ladies" alongside long-time production partner Jacob Hansen, who produced and mixed the band's prior four albums.
 Danny Carey (Tool) admitted that he was the band member that had the motorcycle accident, "I cracked four ribs, broke three of them on a motorcycle the other day, so I am kinda laid up at this point. It's making it really painful to play. It's not an easy thing to do," he said.
 On 18 February 2013, bassist Daniel Antonsson quit Dark Tranquillity on good terms.  Daniel wanted to focus on his own musical projects, play guitar rather than be the bassist in the band, and not wanting to commit to heavy touring of the band's 10th studio album and being a recording engineer/producer in his studio Gothenburg Rock Studios.
 Slayer drummer Dave Lombardo was not able to attend the Australian tour due to misgivings over contract negotiations.  Jon Dette (ex-Evildead, ex-Testament) had replaced Dave for the remainder of the tour.  On May 30, Slayer announced that Dave Lombardo has been officially replaced by Paul Bostaph (ex-Exodus, ex-Testament).
 Bison B.C. were dropped by Metal Blade Records, but the band still remains optimistic about the future.
 Symphony X drummer Jason Rullo suffered heart failure, but recovered with cardiac rehab.
 Korn announced that a new album  featuring Brian "Head" Welch who officially rejoined the band after 8 years of absence.
 Tim Lambesis, vocalists for As I Lay Dying and Austrian Death Machine, was arrested after police said he tried to hire an undercover detective to kill his estranged wife.  Tim has pleaded not guilty, and was released on bail for 2 million on May 31, 2013.
 Mike Portnoy (ex-Dream Theater) leaves Adrenaline Mob due to "scheduling conflicts".
 Protest the Hero drummer and original member Moe Carlson left the band after 12 years.  Moe stated, "just to let you know, I'm going back to school, [I don't] have any intentions of touring ever again."

Deaths
 January 16 – Claudio Leo, former guitarist of Lacuna Coil, died from cancer at the age of 40.
 March 12 – Clive Burr, former drummer of Iron Maiden, Trust and Samson, died from multiple sclerosis complications at the age of 56.
 April 5 – Sławomir Kusterka (a.k.a. Mortifer), bassist of Hate, died from cardiac dysrhythmia in his sleep at the age of 27.
 April 13 – Chi Cheng, bassist of Deftones died from complications following the 2008 car crash he was involved in at the age of 42.
 May 2 – Jeff Hanneman, guitarist of Slayer, died from liver failure after being hospitalized for some days at the age of 49.
 May 18 – Phil Buerstatte, former drummer of White Zombie, died from MRSA infection at the age of 46.
 May 21 – Trevor Bolder, bassist of Uriah Heep and Wishbone Ash, died from pancreatic cancer at the age of 62.
 June 2 – Mick Morris, bassist of Eighteen Visions and live bassist of Bleeding Through, died due to a pre-existing heart condition at the age of 35.
 August 10 – Phil Baheux, drummer of Channel Zero died from a heart problems at the age of 45.
 August 24 – Joey LaCaze, drummer of Eyehategod, died from a respiratory failure at the age of 42.

Films
 Metallica released their 3D movie on August 9, 2013.  The movie is entitled Metallica: Through the Never and was developed by Picturehouse.
 Dream Theater released their movie on November 4, 2013.  The movie is entitled Dream Theater: Live at Luna Park and was developed by Eagle Rock Entertainment.

Albums expected / released

January

February

March

April

May
Onyx; Pop Evil, May 14, 2013

June

July

August

September

October

November

December

References

External links
 About.com: Heavy Metal
 Blabbermouth.net
 Metalstorm.net
 Metalunderground.com
 Ultimate-Guitar.com
 TheGauntlet.com

2010s in heavy metal music
Metal